Xiamen Special Economic Zone, established in October 1980, is one of the five special economic zones in the People's Republic of China. Originally comprising a territory of 2.5 km2 in Xiamen City, it was expanded to 131 km2 in 1984, covering the entire Xiamen Island, which comprises Huli District and Siming District excluding Gulangyu.

Haicang and Xinglin districts were designated "Taiwan Businessmen Investment Zones" on 20 May 1989, and Jimei District was designated in 1992. Foreign investment enjoys the same economic policies as in the special economic zone.

See also
Shantou Special Economic Zone
Shenzhen Special Economic Zone
Zhuhai Special Economic Zone

External links 
Chinavista
CNR
Xinhuanet

Xiamen
Special Economic Zones of China
1980 establishments in China